Novodachnaya is a railway station of Line D1 of the Moscow Central Diameters in Dolgoprudny, Moscow Oblast. It was opened in 1964 and rebuilt in 2020.

Gallery

References

Railway stations in Moscow Oblast
Railway stations of Moscow Railway
Railway stations in Russia opened in 1964
Line D1 (Moscow Central Diameters) stations